Ian Simmonds (born 1966), also known as Juryman, is a Welsh-born electronic musician. He is one of a few talents "to successfully breach the chasm that keeps DJ culture from more tangible, organic realms."
His complex musical landscapes are often accompanied by his deep calm voice, making poetic, political and social statements at the same time. 
He is a self-taught musician, singing and playing trumpet, bass guitar, piano and is a producer with numerous releases, contributions and co-productions.

Biography

Background
Simmonds spent part of his childhood following his trumpet-playing dad around the world. When he turned 18, he moved to London and formed a collective called Sandals with three other friends. This collective came together in the late 1980s to start a club in London Soho called "Violets", a response to the emerging acid house scene and early rave culture. Events in several other clubs followed. In the onset of the 1990s, the "Sandals" were formed in that humus and had little success, suddenly publishing for London Records.
Simmonds started publishing his own deep, vibrant music in 1995 first under his pseudonym Juryman, later on under his real name Ian Simmonds.

Music
In the mid-1990s, Simmonds began recording a series of EPs. In addition he produced his own tracks for the then totally unknown Leftfield and Pressure Drop, which were to influence his later productions. During these recordings, he met musician Luke Gordon a.k.a. Spacer. 1997 SSR published a collaboration LP Juryman vs Spacer: Mailorder Justice
His solo debut LP published in 1999 by !K7 Ian Simmonds: Last States of Nature was well perceived and consolidated his reputation as an innovative producer. It was soon followed by the LP Juryman: The Hill, published in 2000 by SSR Records. 2001 Ian Simmonds: Return to X released at !K7; another Juryman LP got released in 2002, Escape to Where.

Since the midst of the 1990s, he worked with several other artists Leftfield, Goldfrapp, pressure drop on various collaborations, remixes, accompanied by appearances on dozens of compilations. He also contributed the music to Adam Smiths Channel 4 documentary A.I.P.S.

In 2005, Simmonds moved to Germany to work with local musicians on his jazz project Wise in Time; since then he has published as Ian Simmonds for Musik Krause, a sublabel of Freude am Tanzen, where five EPs got released and his recent LP, Ian Simmonds: Burgenland Dubs.

Discography

Albums

The Sandals
Rite to Silence (Acid Jazz), 1994
Yesterdays Tomorrow (Rudiment Records, Japan), 2009

Juryman
Juryman vs Spacer: Mailorder Justice (SSR Records), 2000
The Hill (SSR Records), 2000
Escape to Where (SSR Records), 2002

Ian Simmonds
Last States of Nature (!K7), 1999
Return to X (!K7), 2000
Burgenland Dubs (Musik Krause), 2009
The Right Side of Kind (Goldmin Music), 2015

Wise in Time
The Ballad of Den the Men (Crammed Discs), 2006
Know The Words? (All That's Left), 2009

Singles and EPs

Sandals
"A Profound Gas", Maxi (Acid Jazz), 1992
"We Wanna Live", Maxi (Open Toe Records), 1992
Cracked EP, EP (Open Toe Records), 1994
"Feet", Maxi (Open Toe Records), 1994
"Nothing", Maxi (FFRR), 1998

Juryman
One, 12" (Orange Egg Records), 1995
Two, 12" (All That's Left), 1995
3, 12" (Ntone), 1997
4, 12" (SSR Records), 1997
Remixes from the Hill, 12" (SSR Records), 2001
Overstretchin, Maxi, (SSR Records), 2002

Ian Simmonds
Hidden Witness EP, 12" (!K7), 1999
Man with No Thumbs, 12" (!K7), 1999
Return to X (The Spacer & Slop Shop Remixes), 10" (!K7), 2001
Swinging Millie EP, 12" (!K7), 2001
International Songs, 12" (Musik Krause), 2005
Standing Man EP, 12" (Musik Krause), 2006
The Wendelstein Variantions EP, EP" (Musik Krause), 2008
The Woodhouse EP, 12" (Musik Krause), 2008

Wise in Time
Slowfall, 10" (Electric Tones), 2001

Remixes

Juryman
"Barbara Gogan – Made on Earth (Remixes)" Dangerous (Juryman Mix), SSR Records, 1997
"Statik Sound System – Remix Selection" Free to Choose (Juryman Mix), Cup of Tea Records, 1997
"Suba – Felicidade Remixes" Felicidade (Juryman's Ocean Hill Rework, Crammed Discs, 2000
"So Blue It's Black" So Blue It's Black (Juryman Mix), Blue (Island), 2000
"Clubber's Guide to Breaks" So Blue It's Black (Juryman Mix), Ministry of Sound, 2002
"Suba – Tributo" Felicidade (Juryman Mix), Crammed Discs, 2002
"The Underwolves – Under Your Sky (Remixes)" So Blue It's Black (Juryman Mix), Jazzanova Compost Records, 2002
"Crammed Global Soundclash 1980–89 The Connoisseur Edition" Aksak Maboul's Saure Gurke (Juryman Mix), Crammed Discs, 2003
 Electrix Gypsyland Juryman reconstruction of Taraf de Haidouks Cind Eram La'48, Crammed Discs, 2004

Ian Simmonds
"Silent Poets – Drawing" The Children of the Future (Turnpike Blues Mix) (Ian Simmonds Remix), Toys Factory, 1995
"Sofa Surfers – Constructions: Sofa Surfers Remixed And Dubbed" If It Were Not For You (Ian Simmonds Remix), Klein Records, 1995
"A Guy Called Gerald – Humanity" Humanity (Ian Simmonds Remix), !K7, 2000
"Polar – Mind Of A Killer" Mind Of A Killer (Ian Simmonds Mix), Certificate 18, 2000
"Peace Orchestra – Shining Repolished Versions" Shining (Ian Simmonds Rework), G-Stone Recordings, 2000
"Beanfield – The Season / Catalpa" Catalpa (Ian Simmonds Rework), Compost Records, 2000
"Various: Inside 03" Slop Shop – Gone (Ian Simmonds Rework), Poets CLub Records, 2001
"Beth Hirsch – Nest Sensation" Nest Sensation (Full Vox Repo), !K7, 2001
"Various: Electronic Resistance" Peace Orchestra – Shining (Ian Simmonds Rework), Poets CLub Records, 2001

Tracks on compilations, soundtracks and miscellaneous releases
"Juryman – Know Kname" on The Cream Of Trip Hop (Issue 1) Arctic Records, 1995
"Juryman – If The Law Suits" on Beats By Dope Demand Three Kickin Records, 1996
"Juryman vs Spacer – R.S.I" on Freezone 4 – Dangerous Lullabies, SSR Records, 1997
"Juryman vs Spacer – R.S.I" on Pressure Drop & Tipper – Creative Trip Hop, Sound and Media Ltd., 1997
"Juryman – Bineric Blues" on Naturally Stoned – The Very Best Of Blunted Beats Vol. 1, Millennium Records, 1997
"Juryman – Playground" on The Future Sound Of Jazz Vol. 4 Compost Records, 1997
"Juryman – The Ghost Hunter" on Codachromes Chapter Two, Distance, 2000
"Juryman – The Morning" on New Voices Vol. 37, Rolling Stone, 2000
"Juryman – The Woven" on Trax Sampler 028, Trax Sampler, 2000
"Juryman – East of Here" on Freezone: Seven Is Seven Is, SSR Records, 2001
"Juryman – The Ghost Hunter" on Nova Mix 01 – Full Spectrum – Gilb'R, Nova Records, 2001
"Juryman – The Ghost Hunter" on Distance Cafe, Nova Records, 2002
"Juryman – Belle's Poem" on Novo Brasil 01, Distance Records, 2002
"Juryman – The Ghost Hunter" on Electric Gypsyland, Crammed Discs, 2003
"Juryman – Belle's Poem" on Mosquito Bar 4: Chill Out Sessions, BMG Belgium, 2003
"Juryman vs. Taraf de Haïdouks – Cind Eram La '48 (Chronicle Of A Peasant Uprising)" on Electric Gypsiland, Crammed Discs, 2003
"Juryman – Chinese Mike" on Cabin In The Sky, Cramboy, 2004
"Juryman – Overstretchin" on 'Nu Pop, Wagram, 2004
"Juryman – The Morning" on Trip Hop Anthology, Wagram, 2006
"Juryman – The Morning" on Saint-Germain Des-Pres Café Paris, Wagram, 2007
"Ian Simmonds 	– Luna Swell" on Atlas Earth, Jumpin' & Pumpin', 1997
"Ian Simmonds 	– Childhood" on Joint Ventures, NINEBARecords, 1997
"Ian Simmonds 	– The Man With No Thumbs" on Offering 2: The Past, Present & Future Of !K7, !K7, 1998
"Ian Simmonds 	– Theme To The Last Puma" on Transatlantik Lounging, Life Enhancing Audio, 1999
"Ian Simmonds 	– Alvin's Blues" on Musikexpress 42 – !K7, Life Enhancing Audio, 2000
"Ian Simmonds 	– Alvin's Blues" on Cassagrande Lounge, Cassagrande, 2001
"Ian Simmonds – Jet" on Mind The Gap Volume 35, Gonzo Circus, 2001
"Ian Simmonds 	– Swingin' Millie (Slop Shop Jam)" on Kid Kenobi Featuring MC Shureshock – Clubber's Guide To Breaks Vol. 2, Ministry of Sound, 2002
"Ian Simmonds 	– Swingin' Millie (Slop Shop Mix)" on Music For Modern Living Vol. 5, Lounge Records, 2001
"Ian Simmonds 	– Theme To The Last Puma" on Saint-Germain-Des-Prés Café, Wagram, 2001
"Ian Simmonds 	– Alvin's Blues" on Springone Compilation, Zeiger Records, 2001
"Ian Simmonds 	– Alvin's Blues" on The Chillout Lounge, Smooth Music, 2001
"Ian Simmonds  – Swingin' Millie (Slop Shop Mix)" on Fruit 2 – Melon, Musicpark Records, 2002
"Ian Simmonds & DJ Rocca – Better Man" on Illicit Sounds Of Maffia – Chapter 3, Kom-Fut Manifesto Records, 2003
"Ian Simmonds 	– The Dog" on Michael Mayer – Immer 2, Kompakt, 2006
"Wise in Time 	– Slow Fall" on Club Bogaloo 2, Spinning Wheels Records, 2003

Contributions
"Sandals – Venice Groove" on Volume Five, (Bass Ian Simmonds), Volume, 1992
"How Now – Humble Souls" on Humble Souls – How Now, (Producer Ian Simmonds, et al.), Acid Jazz, 1993
"Sandals – Venice Groove" on Wasted – The Best Of Volume (Part 1), (Bass Ian Simmonds), Volume, 1995
"Spacer – Agent Orange" on Spacer – Atlas Earth, (Vocals, Written by Ian Simmonds), Pussyfoot Records, 1996
"Spacer – Cursory Rub" on Spacer – The Beamer, (Bass Ian Simmonds), Pussyfoot Records, 2001
"Spacer – Houston" on Red Snapper – It's All Good (Live Version), (Bass Ian Simmonds), Keep Diggin' Records, 2002
"Spacer – Houston" on Red Snapper – It's All Good (Live Version), (Bass Ian Simmonds), Keep Diggin' Records, 2002
"The Orchestra – Tune Three" on The Orchestra – Look Away Now, (Bass Ian Simmonds), Dummond Street Records, 2002
"Sandals – Nothing" on Giant Steps (Volume One), (Written by Ian Simmonds, et al.), FFRR (US), 1993
"Sandals – A Profound Gas" on Soul CD 8 In Conjunction With Acid Jazz, (Written by Ian Simmonds, et al.), Soul CD Magazine, 1993
"Sandals – Nothing (Leftfield Dub)" on Slowburn: Blissed-Out Beats And After Hours Anthems, (Written by Ian Simmonds, et al.), Rumor Records, 1993
"Sandals – We wanna live" on Silly Symphonies – Guerrilla, fight for your right to party, (Written by Ian Simmonds, et al.), Essential Dance Music, 1996
"Sandals – Feet (Scott Hardkiss Remix)" on Yes – A Scott Hardkiss Mix, (Written by Ian Simmonds, et al.), Hardkiss, 1996
"Sandals – Nothing" on Roadkill! 1.10, (Written by Ian Simmonds, et al.), Hot Tracks, 2000
"Sandals – Feet (Dust Brothers Remix)" on The Chemical Brothers – The Remixes Vol. 06, (Written by Ian Simmonds, et al.), Dummond Street Records, 2002
"Sandals – Nothing" on The Chillout Session: Ibiza Sunsets, (Written by Ian Simmonds, et al.), Ministry of Sound, 2003
"Sandals – Nothing" on Acid Jazz Classics, (Written by Ian Simmonds, et al.), Ministry of Sound, 2004
"Sandals – Venice Groove" on Denz Da Denz Vol. 1'', (Written by Ian Simmonds, et al.), BMG, 2004

References

External links
Official Artist Site
label Freude-am-Tanzen

Interviews
Podcast Interview with Ian Simmonds in english 2000
Interview with Ian Simmonds in german 2001
Interview with Ian Simmonds in german 2001
Podcast Deutschlandfunk-Feature with Ian Simmonds in german 2009

1966 births
British trip hop musicians
Welsh electronic musicians
Welsh DJs
Welsh record producers
Living people
Nu jazz musicians
Electronic dance music DJs